Field punishment is any form of punishment used against military personnel in the field; that is, field punishment does not require that the member be incarcerated in a military prison or reassigned to a punishment battalion. It may be formalised under a system of military justice and may be a sentence imposed in a court martial or similar proceedings

In English language contexts, "field punishment" refers specifically to Field Punishment Number One, which was used by the British Army between 1881 and 1923 and the armies of some other British Empire countries.

British Army

1881–1923

Field Punishment was introduced in 1881 following the abolition of flogging. It was a common punishment during World War I. A commanding officer could award field punishment for up to 28 days, while a court martial could award it for up to 90 days, either as Field Punishment Number One or Field Punishment Number Two.

Field Punishment Number One, often abbreviated to "F.P. No. 1", "No. 1 field", or even just "No. 1", consisted of the convicted man being placed in fetters and handcuffs or similar restraints and attached to a fixed object, such as a gun wheel or a fence post, for up to two hours per day. During the early part of World War I, the punishment was often applied with the arms stretched out and the legs tied together, giving rise to the nickname "crucifixion". This was applied for up to three days out of four, up to 21 days total. It was usually applied in field punishment camps set up for this purpose a few miles behind the front line, but when the unit was on the move it would be carried out by the unit itself. It has been alleged that this punishment was sometimes applied within range of enemy fire. During World War I Field Punishment Number One was issued by the British Army on 60,210 occasions.

Conscientious objectors who had been conscripted to the army were treated the same as any other soldier, so when they consistently refused to obey orders they were usually given Field Punishment No. 1. Alfred Evans, who was sent to France where he would be sentenced to death (later commuted) with 34 others claimed that "it was very uncomfortable, but certainly not humiliating". Some conscientious objectors even saw F.P. No. 1 as a badge of honour.

Although the 1914 Manual of Military Law specifically stated that Field Punishment should not be applied in such a way as to cause physical harm, in practice abuses were commonplace. For example, the prisoner would deliberately be placed in stress positions, with his feet not fully touching the ground, or the punishment would be applied in driving rain or snow. The New Zealand conscientious objector Archibald Baxter gave a particularly graphic account of his experience with Field Punishment No. 1 in his autobiography "We Will Not Cease". Baxter's story was dramatised in the 2014 TV movie Field Punishment No 1.

In Field Punishment Number Two, the prisoner was placed in fetters and handcuffs but was not attached to a fixed object and was still able to march with his unit. This was a relatively tolerable punishment.

In both forms of field punishment, the soldier was also subjected to hard labour and loss of pay.

Field Punishment Number One was eventually abolished in 1923, when an amendment to the Army Act which specifically forbade attachment to a fixed object was passed by the House of Lords. However, physical restraint remained a theoretical (though rarely imposed) possibility.

Other examples

Australian & New Zealand forces during the Vietnam War
According to author Paul Ham, Australian soldiers caught asleep on sentry duty in the Vietnam War, would be sentenced to 28 days' field punishment usually in the form of hard labour and would lose one week's pay. On its first tour of Vietnam the Australian 105th Field Battery came under much media scrutiny as a result of the “O’Neill affair”. In February 1966 20-year-old Gunner Peter O’Neill, who had been absent without leave when rostered for  guard duty, failed to appear on a field punishment parade. The battery commander, Major Peter Tedder had ordered O’Neill to be handcuffed to a metal stake in a weapons pit for 20 days at the Bien Hoa airbase. Gunner O'Neill contends that Major Tedder refused his right to a trial by Court Martial as a result he refused the Major's punishment but he was released and flown to serve time in the army prison at Holsworthy outside Sydney when questions were raised in the Australian parliament. Following a visit by Gough Whitlam and a vote in parliament he was released forthwith. Major Tedder was Court Martialed but acquitted as Gunner O'Neill did not give evidence and the illegal punishment had been condoned by a Superior officer. To date Gunner O'Neill has not told his side of the story.

New Zealand servicemen that served in the Vietnam War with V Force (Vietnam Force) were not exempt from field punishment with some being locked inside large shipping containers for considerable time in the sweltering heat.

Argentine forces in the Malvinas/Falklands war
According to Ernesto Alonso, a senior member of the Centre of Former Malvinas Islands Combatants in La Plata (CECIM), Argentine officers and NCOs ordered the staking out of several conscripts during the Falklands War.
Most were 10th Brigade conscripts, and either had fallen asleep during guard duty or had gone absent without leave from their companies to either hunt sheep with their service rifles or steal from the food depots and locals in Port Stanley.

French Foreign Legion
The French Foreign Legion had its own field punishment. A legionnaire in the 1990s, Gareth Carins witnessed this punishment. While in training, a recruit called Schuhmann was caught deserting the training camp. Carins in the book Voices of the Foreign Legion: The French Foreign Legion in Its Own Words described how he saw Schuhmann slumped at the bottom of a flag pole: "His wrists had been bound together behind the flag pole, as had his ankles, so that it was impossible to stand up, and he was forced into a sort of kneeling position.  I could see blood on the side of his face." In the book Mouthful of Rocks: Through Africa and Corsica in the French Foreign Legion former legionnaire and author Chris Jennings writes that recruits, as a form of punishment, had to dig graves in frozen soil, where the man would then spend the night, buried up to his neck.

Notes

External links
 1914 Manual of Military Law - application of field punishment
 Brief description and illustration of Field Punishment Number One
 "When Tommy was in trouble" - common offences and punishments during World War I
 Archibald Baxter's account of Field Punishment Number One

Physical restraint
Military discipline